Che Sudaka is a four-piece band, composed of Argentines and Colombians living in Barcelona, Spain. The band defines itself as punk reggae party while using rhythms inspired by hip-hop and ska.

Name 
The name comes from putting together the words "che", that in Mapuche language means "people", and "sudaca", which is a derogatory term used in Spain to refer to South Americans.

Music 

The group play "mestizaje music" (Latin Alternative), a style combining traditional South American and Spanish styles with influences from ska, reggae, rock and world music. They have collaborated on projects with Manu Chao and Amparanoia.

The Band formed at the beginning of the 2000s in Barcelona by Hispanic American immigrants who played music in the streets in order to make a living and who had arrived at Barcelona in the wake of Manu Chao, one of their strongest musical influences.

In March of 2012, the band turned 10 years since their formation, during which time they had performed 1000 concerts.

Discography 
Trippie Town (2003)
Alerta Bihotza (2005)
Mirando El Mundo Al Reves (2007)
 Tudo é Possible (2009)
 Cavernicola Recording Vol.1 (2010)
 10 (2011)
 1111 Lives (2013)
 Hoy (2014)
 Almas Rebeldes (November 2017)

Festivals
The band performed at:

 WOMAD Festival, England (2009)
 Fuji Rock Festival, Japan (2012)
 Nilüfer Müzik Festivali, Türkiye (2015)
 Pol'and'Rock Festival, Poland (2016)
 Czad Festival, Poland (2017)
  Street Mode Festival, Thessaloniki, Greece (2019)

External links
 chesudaka.com - Official website

References

Spanish world music groups
Rock en Español music groups